Justin Bailey (born July 1, 1995) is an American professional ice hockey forward who is currently playing for the Bakersfield Condors of the American Hockey League (AHL), while under contract to the Edmonton Oilers of the National Hockey League (NHL). Bailey grew up in Williamsville, New York, a suburb of Buffalo.

Early life 
Bailey was born on July 1, 1995, in Buffalo, New York. He grew up in nearby Williamsville, in the same apartment complex as several members of the Buffalo Sabres of the National Hockey League (NHL). His father Carlton Bailey was a gridiron football player who served as a linebacker for the Buffalo Bills of the National Football League (NFL). Carlton played with the Bills for five seasons, and made the touchdown that helped take the team to Super Bowl XXVI in 1992. Bailey's parents separated when he was young, and he lived with his mother, Karen Buscaglia, while maintaining contact with his father during birthdays or holidays.

Bailey's minor ice hockey career began with the Buffalo Regals of the Midwest Elite Hockey League (MEHL). A shoulder injury limited Bailey to 22 games during the 2010-11 MEHL season, during which he scored 13 goals and nine assists. Bailey also helped take the Regals to the state championship finals, where they faced the Long Island Royals and coach Pat LaFontaine, who was intrigued both by Bailey's size and by his talent.

Playing career

Buffalo Sabres 

Bailey was selected by his hometown team, the Buffalo Sabres in the 2nd round (52nd overall) of the 2013 NHL Entry Draft.

Bailey signed a three-year entry-level contract with the Sabres on November 2, 2014. He was recalled to the Sabres from the American Hockey League's Rochester Americans on February 10, 2016 and made his NHL debut on February 11. He was reassigned to Rochester on February 18, only to be recalled again three days later following an injury to Ryan O'Reilly. He scored his first NHL goal on January 3, 2017 against Henrik Lundqvist and the New York Rangers.

During the 2017–18 season, Bailey was suspended one game for a high hit on Reid McNeil during a game against the Syracuse Crunch in March. However, he was called up to the NHL on March 14, 2018, a day before he was set to serve his suspension. He was set to serve his suspension once he is sent back to the AHL. He was reassigned to the AHL on March 27, 2018, after playing in 5 games.

Philadelphia Flyers 
The Sabres traded Bailey to the Philadelphia Flyers on January 17, 2019, in exchange for forward Taylor Leier. He was assigned to the Lehigh Valley Phantoms, the Flyers' AHL affiliate, playing on a line with Mikahil Vorobyev and Colin McDonald for the Flyers to assess whether there was a position for him in their NHL roster. He was recalled to the Flyers on February 10 under suspicion that, should Wayne Simmonds be traded as part of the February 25 trading deadline, Bailey would take his position in the roster. Even after Simmonds was traded to the Nashville Predators, however, Bailey struggled to remain in the Flyers lineup, and spent most of his time in Lehigh. Between February 10 and April 11, Bailey was sent either up or down between the two teams 10 times. His final recall came on March 20, and he finished out the season with the Flyers. Altogether, he played 11 games for Philadelphia and 17 for Lehigh Valley. The Flyers did not extend a qualifying offer to Bailey at the end of the season, making him an unrestricted free agent.

Vancouver Canucks 
On July 4, 2019, Bailey signed to a one-year, two-way contract with the Vancouver Canucks.

On January 30, 2020, Bailey was called-up by the Vancouver Canucks from the Utica Comets following an injury to Tyler Motte. He appeared in two games prior to the pause of the 2019–20 season.

After playing just 3 games, Bailey was injured on February 11, 2021. The injury required surgery causing him to miss the remainder of the season.

Edmonton Oilers
As a free agent from the Canucks, Bailey failed to gain interest for a NHL contract before opting to sign a one-year AHL deal with the Bakersfield Condors on September 8, 2022. In the 2022–23 season, Bailey recorded 10 points through his first 16 games with the Condors leading him to sign a one-year, two-way contract with NHL affiliate, the Edmonton Oilers, on January 6, 2023.

Personal life
He is the son of former Buffalo Bills linebacker Carlton Bailey and was raised by his mother, Karen Buscaglia.

Career statistics

Regular season and playoffs

International

References

External links

1995 births
Living people
Abbotsford Canucks players
African-American ice hockey players
American men's ice hockey forwards
Bakersfield Condors players
Buffalo Sabres draft picks
Buffalo Sabres players
Ice hockey players from New York (state)
Indiana Ice players
Kitchener Rangers players
Lehigh Valley Phantoms players
People from Williamsville, New York
Philadelphia Flyers players
Rochester Americans players
Sault Ste. Marie Greyhounds players
Utica Comets players
Vancouver Canucks players
21st-century African-American sportspeople